Portneuf is a regional county municipality (RCM) in the Capitale-Nationale administrative region of Quebec, Canada. RCM of Portneuf has been established on January 1, 1982. It is composed of 21 municipalities: nine cities, seven municipalities, two parishes and three unorganized territories. The county seat is located in Cap-Santé.

History 
The Regional County Municipality of Portneuf was constituted as a regional administrative entity on November 25, 1981, by a Provincial decree creating the supralocal Regional County Municipality administration based on the (...) and therefore replacing the previously existing historic Portneuf County Corporation. While the new administrative boundary included most of the communities from its previous historic limits, a few municipalities were merged with bordering entities: St-Augustin-de-Desmaures, Sainte-Catherine-de-Portneuf, Notre-Dame-de-Montauban, Quebec. Those municipalities yet remained within the Electoral Federal Riding of Portneuf District (all but Notre-Dame-de-Mautauban).

The administrative county seat remained in Cap-Santé while moving from the County Corporation building to a newly built one located further east on 185, Route 138 at a slight distance from the historic village of Cap-Santé.

Subdivisions 
There are 21 subdivisions within the RCM:

Cities & Towns (9)
 Cap-Santé
 Donnacona
 Lac-Sergent
 Neuville
 Pont-Rouge
 Portneuf
 Saint-Basile
 Saint-Marc-des-Carrières
 Saint-Raymond

Municipalities (7)
 Deschambault-Grondines
 Rivière-à-Pierre
 Saint-Alban
 Saint-Casimir
 Sainte-Christine-d'Auvergne
 Saint-Léonard-de-Portneuf
 Saint-Ubalde

Parishes (2)
 Saint-Gilbert
 Saint-Thuribe

Unorganized Territory (3)
 Lac-Blanc
 Lac-Lapeyrère
 Linton

Transportation

Access Routes
Highways and numbered routes that run through the municipality, including external routes that start or finish at the county border:

 Autoroutes
 

 Principal Highways
 

 Secondary Highways
 
 
 
 
 

 External Routes
 None

See also
 List of regional county municipalities and equivalent territories in Quebec
 Portneuf County, Quebec

References